Fred Doederlein (born Lothar Fritz Oskar Döderlein; 24 April 1906 – 23 April 1985) was a German stage and film actor. He played leading roles in several silent films during the 1920s. He later emigrated to Canada and appeared in David Cronenberg's first feature, Shivers, as Dr Emil Hobbes, and in Scanners as Yoga Master Tautz.

Filmography

References

Bibliography
 John Kenneth Muir. Horror Films of the 1980s. 2012.

External links

1906 births
1985 deaths
German male stage actors
German male film actors
German male silent film actors
20th-century German male actors
German emigrants to Canada